The 2019–20 season was Venezia F.C.'s third consecutive season in second division of the Italian football league, the Serie B, and the 113th as a football club.

Players

First-team quad

Out on loan

Pre-season and friendlies

Competitions

Overall record

Serie A

League table

Results summary

Results by round

Matches
The league fixtures were announced on 6 August 2019.

Coppa Italia

References

Venezia F.C. seasons
Venezia